Jacob Low is a personal name. It may refer to:
 Jacob Low (squatter-legislator), Queensland squatter-landowner and member of their state parliament
 Jacob Low (Wisconsin farmer-legislator), Wisconsin farmer who served in their state legislature